A mobile device (or handheld computer) is a computer small enough to hold and operate in the hand. Mobile devices typically have a flat LCD or OLED screen, a touchscreen interface, and digital or physical buttons. They may also have a physical keyboard. Many such devices can connect to the Internet and connect with other devices such as car entertainment systems or headsets via Wi-Fi, Bluetooth, cellular networks or near field communication. Integrated cameras, the ability to place and receive voice and video telephone calls, video games, and Global Positioning System (GPS) capabilities are common. Power is typically provided by a lithium-ion battery. Mobile devices may run mobile operating systems that allow third-party applications to be installed and run.

Early smartphones were joined in the late 2000s by larger tablets. Input and output are usually via a touch-screen interface. Phones/tablets and personal digital assistants may provide much of the functionality of a laptop/desktop computer in addition to exclusive features. Enterprise digital assistants can provide additional business functionality such as integrated data capture via barcode, RFID and smart card readers.

By 2010, mobile devices often contained sensors such as accelerometers, magnetometers and gyroscopes, allowing the detection of orientation and motion. Mobile devices may provide biometric user authentication, such as face recognition or fingerprint recognition.

Major global manufacturers of mobile devices are Samsung, Huawei, Meizu, Zte, Xiaomi, Sony, Google, HTC, LG, TCL, Motorola Mobility, Nokia, Realme and Micromax Informatics.

Characteristics
Device mobility can be viewed in the context of several qualities:
 Physical dimensions and weight
 Whether the device is mobile or some kind of host to which it is attached is mobile
 To what kind of host devices can it be bound
 How devices communicate with a host
 When mobility occurs

Strictly speaking, many so-called mobile devices are not mobile. It is the host that is mobile, i.e., a mobile human host carries a non-mobile smartphone device. An example of a true mobile computing device, where the device itself is mobile, is a robot. Another example is an autonomous vehicle.

There are three basic ways mobile devices can be physically bound to mobile hosts: accompanied, surface-mounted, or embedded into the fabric of a host, e.g., an embedded controller in a host device. Accompanied refers to an object being loosely bound and accompanying a mobile host, e.g., a smartphone can be carried in a bag or pocket but can easily be misplaced. Hence, mobile hosts with embedded devices such as an autonomous vehicle can appear larger than pocket-sized.

The most common size of a mobile computing device is pocket-sized, but other sizes for mobile devices exist. Mark Weiser, known as the father of ubiquitous computing, referred to device sizes that are tab-sized, pad and board sized, where tabs are defined as accompanied or wearable centimetre-sized devices, e.g. smartphones, phablets and pads are defined as hand-held decimeter-sized devices. If one changes the form of the mobile devices in terms of being non-planar, one can also have skin devices and tiny dust-sized devices. Dust refers to miniaturized devices without direct HCI interfaces, e.g., micro-electro-mechanical systems (MEMS), ranging from nanometres through micrometres to millimeters. See also Smart dust. Skin: fabrics based upon light emitting and conductive polymers and organic computer devices. These can be formed into more flexible non-planar display surfaces and products such as clothes and curtains, see OLED display. Also, see smart device.

Although mobility is often regarded as synonymous with having wireless connectivity, these terms are different. Not all network access by mobile users, applications and devices need to be via wireless networks and vice versa. Wireless access devices can be static and mobile users can move in between wired and wireless hotspots such as in Internet cafés. Some mobile devices can be used as mobile Internet devices to access the Internet while moving, but they do not need to do this and many phone functions or applications are still operational even while disconnected from the Internet.

What makes the mobile device unique compared to other technologies is the inherent flexibility in the hardware and also software. Flexible applications include video chat, Web browsing, payment systems, near field communication, audio recording etc. As mobile devices become ubiquitous, there will be a proliferation of services which include the use of the cloud. Although a common form of mobile device, a smartphone, has a display, another perhaps even more common form of smart computing device, the smart card, e.g., used as a bank card or travel card, does not have a display. This mobile device often has a CPU and memory but needs to connect or be inserted into a reader to display its internal data or state.

Types

There are many kinds of mobile devices, designed for different applications. They include:

 Mobile computers
 Tablet computer
 Netbook
 Digital media player
 Enterprise digital assistant
 Graphing calculator
 Handheld game console
 Handheld PC
 Laptop
 Mobile Internet device (MID)
 Personal digital assistant (PDA)
 Pocket calculator
 Portable media player
 Ultra-mobile PC
 Mobile phones
 Camera phones
 Feature phones
 Smartphones
 Phablets
 Digital cameras
 Digital camcorder
 Digital still camera (DSC)
 Digital video camera (DVC)
 Front-facing camera
 Pagers
 Personal navigation device (PND)
 Wearable computers
 Calculator watch
 Smartwatch
 Smartglasses
 Head-mounted display
 Smart cards

Uses 

Handheld devices have become more rugged for use in mobile field management. This involves tasks such as digitizing notes, sending and receiving invoices, asset management, recording signatures, managing parts and scanning barcodes.

In 2009, developments in mobile collaboration systems enabled the use of handheld devices that combine video, audio and on-screen drawing capabilities to enable multi-party conferencing in real-time, independent of location. Handheld computers are available in a variety of form factors, including smartphones on the low end, handheld PDAs, Ultra-Mobile PCs and Tablet PCs (Palm OS, WebOS). Users can watch television through the Internet by IPTV on some mobile devices. Mobile television receivers have existed since the 1960s, and in the 21st-century mobile phone providers began making television available on cellular phones.

In the 2010s, mobile devices were observed to frequently include the ability to sync and share a variety of data despite the distance or specifications of the devices. In the medical field, mobile devices are quickly becoming essential tools for accessing clinical information such as drugs, treatment, and even medical calculation. Due to the popularity of mobile gaming, the gambling industry started offering casino games on mobile devices, which led to the inclusion of these devices in the anti-hazard legislature as devices that could potentially be used for illegal gambling. Other potentially illegal activities might include the use of mobile devices in distributing child pornography and the legal sex industry's use of mobile apps and hardware to promote its activities, as well as the possibility of using mobile devices to perform trans-border services, which are all issues that need to be regulated. In the military, mobile devices have created new opportunities for the armed forces to deliver training and educational materials to soldiers, regardless of where they are stationed.

See also 
 Converged device
 List of emerging technologies
 Mobile interaction
 Near field communication
 Smart device

References

Sources 
 
 

Information appliances
Mobile computers
Personal digital assistants